Gerard Manley Hopkins  (28 July 1844 – 8 June 1889) was an English poet and Jesuit priest, whose posthumous fame placed him among leading Victorian poets. His prosody – notably his concept of sprung rhythm – established him as an innovator, as did his praise of God through vivid use of imagery and nature. Only after his death did Robert Bridges publish a few of Hopkins's mature poems in anthologies, hoping to prepare for wider acceptance of his style. By 1930 Hopkins's work was seen as one of the most original literary advances of his century. It intrigued such leading 20th-century poets as T. S. Eliot, Dylan Thomas, W. H. Auden, Stephen Spender and Cecil Day-Lewis.

Early life and family
Gerard Manley Hopkins was born in Stratford, Essex (now in Greater London), as the eldest of probably nine children to Manley and Catherine Hopkins, née Smith. He was christened at the Anglican church of St John's, Stratford. His father founded a marine insurance firm and at one time served as Hawaiian consul-general in London. He was also for a time churchwarden at St John-at-Hampstead. His grandfather was the physician John Simm Smith, a university colleague of John Keats, and close friend of the eccentric philanthropist Ann Thwaytes. One of his uncles was Charles Gordon Hopkins, a politician of the Hawaiian Kingdom.

As a poet, Hopkins's father published works including A Philosopher's Stone and Other Poems (1843), Pietas Metrica (1849), and Spicelegium Poeticum, A Gathering of Verses by Manley Hopkins (1892). He reviewed poetry for The Times and wrote one novel. Catherine (Smith) Hopkins was the daughter of a London physician, particularly fond of music and of reading, especially German philosophy, literature and the novels of Dickens. Both parents were deeply religious high-church Anglicans. Catherine's sister, Maria Smith Giberne, taught her nephew Gerard to sketch. The interest was supported by his uncle, Edward Smith, his great-uncle Richard James Lane, a professional artist, and other family members. Hopkins's initial ambition was to be a painter – he would continue to sketch throughout his life and was inspired as an adult by the work of John Ruskin and the Pre-Raphaelites.

Hopkins became a skilled draughtsman. He found his early training in visual art supported his later work as a poet. His siblings drew a lot of inspiration from literature, religion, and the arts. In 1878, Milicent (1849–1946) enrolled in an Anglican sisterhood. Kate (1856–1933) would help Hopkins publish the first edition of his poetry. Hopkins's youngest sister Grace (1857–1945) set many of his poems to music. Lionel (1854–1952) became a world-famous expert on archaic and colloquial Chinese. Arthur (1848–1930) and Everard (1860–1928) were highly successful artists. Cyril (1846–1932) would join his father's insurance firm.

Manley Hopkins moved his family to Hampstead in 1852, near where John Keats had lived 30 years before and close to the green spaces of Hampstead Heath. When he was ten years old, Gerard was sent to board at Highgate School (1854–1863). While studying Keats's poetry, he wrote "The Escorial" (1860), his earliest extant poem. Here he practised early attempts at asceticism. He once argued that most people drank more liquids than they really needed and bet that he could go without drinking for a week. He persisted until his tongue was black and he collapsed at drill. On another occasion he abstained from salt for a week. Among his teachers at Highgate was Richard Watson Dixon, who became an enduring friend and correspondent. Of the older pupils Hopkins recalls in his boarding house, the poet Philip Stanhope Worsley won the Newdigate Prize.

Oxford and priesthood
Hopkins studied classics at Balliol College, Oxford (1863–1867). He began his time in Oxford as a keen socialite and prolific poet, but seems to have alarmed himself with resulting changes in his behaviour. There he forged a lifelong friendship with Robert Bridges (later Poet Laureate of the United Kingdom), which would be important to his development as a poet and in establishing his posthumous acclaim. Hopkins was deeply impressed with the work of Christina Rossetti, who became one of his great contemporary influences. The two met in 1864. During this time he studied with the writer and critic Walter Pater, who tutored him in 1866 and remained a friend until Hopkins left Oxford for the second time in October 1879.

In a journal entry of 6 November 1865, Hopkins declared an ascetic intention for his life and work: "On this day by God's grace I resolved to give up all beauty until I had His leave for it." On 18 January 1866, Hopkins composed his most ascetic poem, The Habit of Perfection. On 23 January, he included poetry in a list of things to be given up for Lent. In July, he decided to become a Roman Catholic and travelled to Birmingham in September to consult the leader of the Oxford converts, John Henry Newman. Newman received him into the Roman Catholic Church on 21 October 1866.

The decision to convert estranged Hopkins from his family and from a number of acquaintances. After graduating in 1867, he was provided by Newman with a teaching post at the Oratory in Birmingham. While there he began to study the violin. On 5 May 1868 Hopkins firmly "resolved to be a religious." Less than a week later, he made a bonfire of his poetry and gave it up almost entirely for seven years. He also felt a call to enter the ministry and decided to become a Jesuit. He paused first to visit Switzerland, which officially forbade Jesuits to enter.

In September 1868 Hopkins began his Jesuit novitiate at Manresa House, Roehampton, under the guidance of Alfred Weld. Two years later he moved to St Mary's Hall, Stonyhurst, for philosophical studies, taking vows of poverty, chastity and obedience on 8 September 1870. He felt that his interest in poetry had stopped him devoting himself wholly to religion. However, on reading Duns Scotus in 1872, he saw how the two need not conflict. He continued to write a detailed prose journal in 1868–1875. Unable to suppress a desire to describe the natural world, he also wrote music, sketched, and for church occasions, wrote "verses", as he called them. He later wrote sermons and other religious pieces.

In 1874 Hopkins returned to Manresa House to teach classics. While studying in the Jesuit house of theological studies, St Beuno's College, near St Asaph in North Wales, he was asked by his religious superior to write a poem to commemorate the foundering of a German ship in a storm. So in 1875 he took up poetry once more to write a lengthy piece, "The Wreck of the Deutschland", inspired by the Deutschland incident, a maritime disaster in which 157 people died, including five Franciscan nuns who had been leaving Germany due to harsh anti-Catholic laws (see Kulturkampf). The work displays both the religious concerns and some of the unusual metre and rhythms of his subsequent poetry not present in his few remaining early works. It not only depicts the dramatic events and heroic deeds, but tells of him reconciling the terrible events with God's higher purpose. The poem was accepted but not printed by a Jesuit publication. This rejection fed his ambivalence about his poetry, most of which remained unpublished until after his death.

Hopkins chose the austere and restrictive life of a Jesuit and was gloomy at times. His biographer Robert Bernard Martin notes that "the life expectancy of a man becoming a novice at twenty-one was twenty-three more years rather than the forty years of males of the same age in the general population." The brilliant student who had left Oxford with first-class honours failed his final theology exam. This almost certainly meant that despite his ordination in 1877, Hopkins would not progress in the order. In 1877 he wrote God's Grandeur, an array of sonnets that included "The Starlight Night". He finished "The Windhover" only a few months before his ordination. His life as a Jesuit trainee, though rigorous, isolated and sometimes unpleasant, at least had some stability; the uncertain and varied work after ordination was even harder on his sensibilities. In October 1877, not long after completing "The Sea and the Skylark" and only a month after his ordination, Hopkins took up duties as sub-minister and teacher at Mount St Mary's College near Sheffield. In July 1878 he became curate at the Jesuit church in Mount Street, London, and in December that of St Aloysius's Church, Oxford, then moving to Manchester, Liverpool and Glasgow. While ministering in Oxford, he became a founding member of The Newman Society, established in 1878 for Catholic members of the University of Oxford. He taught Greek and Latin at Mount St Mary's College, Sheffield, and Stonyhurst College, Lancashire.

In the late 1880s Hopkins met Matthew Russell of the Irish Monthly, who introduced him to Katharine Tynan and W. B. Yeats.

In 1884 he became a professor of Greek and Latin at University College Dublin. His English roots and disagreement with the Irish politics of the time, along with his small stature, unprepossessing nature and personal oddities, reduced his effectiveness as a teacher. This and his isolation in Ireland deepened a gloom that was reflected in his poems of the time, such as "I Wake and Feel the Fell of Dark, not Day". They came to be known as the "terrible sonnets", not for their quality but according to Hopkins's friend Canon Richard Watson Dixon, because they reached the "terrible crystal", meaning they crystallised the melancholic dejection that plagued the latter part of Hopkins's life.

Final years
Several influences led to a melancholic state and restricted his poetic inspiration in his last five years. His workload was heavy. He disliked living in Dublin, away from England and friends. He was disappointed at how far Dublin had fallen from its Georgian elegance of the previous century. His general health suffered and his eyesight began to fail. He felt confined and dejected. As a devout Jesuit, he found himself in an artistic dilemma. To subdue an egotism that he felt would violate the humility required by his religious position, he decided never to publish his poems but Hopkins realised that any true poet requires an audience for criticism and encouragement. This conflict between his religious obligations and his poetic talent made him feel he had failed at both.

After several years' ill health and bouts of diarrhoea, Hopkins died of typhoid fever in 1889 at the age of 44 years and was buried in Glasnevin Cemetery, after a funeral in St Francis Xavier Church in Gardiner Street, located in Georgian Dublin. He is thought to have suffered throughout his life from what today might be labelled bipolar disorder or chronic unipolar depression, and battled a deep sense of melancholic anguish. However, his last words on his death bed were, "I am so happy, I am so happy."

Poetry

"The sonnets of desolation"
According to John Bayley, "All his life Hopkins was haunted by the sense of personal bankruptcy and impotence, the straining of 'time's eunuch' with no more to 'spend'... " a sense of inadequacy, graphically expressed in his last sonnets. Toward the end of his life, Hopkins suffered several long bouts of depression. His "terrible sonnets" struggle with problems of religious doubt. He described them to Bridges as "[t]he thin gleanings of a long weary while."

"Thou Art Indeed Just, Lord" (1889) echoes Jeremiah 12:1 in asking why the wicked prosper. It reflects the exasperation of a faithful servant who feels he has been neglected, and is addressed to a divine person ("Sir") capable of hearing the complaint, but seemingly unwilling to listen. Hopkins uses parched roots as a metaphor for despair.

The image of the poet's estrangement from God figures in "I wake and feel the fell of dark, not day", in which he describes lying awake before dawn, likening his prayers to "dead letters sent To dearest him that lives alas! away." The opening line recalls Lamentations 3:2: "He hath led me, and brought me into darkness, but not into light."

"No Worst, There is None" and "Carrion Comfort" are also counted among the "terrible sonnets".

Sprung rhythm

Much of Hopkins's historical importance has to do with the changes he brought to the form of poetry, which ran contrary to conventional ideas of metre. Prior to Hopkins, most Middle English and Modern English poetry was based on a rhythmic structure inherited from the Norman side of English literary heritage. This structure is based on repeating "feet" of two or three syllables, with the stressed syllable falling in the same place on each repetition. Hopkins called this structure "running rhythm", and although he wrote some of his early verse in running rhythm, he became fascinated with the older rhythmic structure of the Anglo-Saxon tradition, of which Beowulf is the most famous example.

Hopkins called his own rhythmic structure sprung rhythm. Sprung rhythm is structured around feet with a variable number of syllables, generally between one and four syllables per foot, with the stress always falling on the first syllable in a foot. It is similar to the "rolling stresses" of Robinson Jeffers, another poet who rejected conventional metre. Hopkins saw sprung rhythm as a way to escape the constraints of running rhythm, which he said inevitably pushed poetry written in it to become "same and tame". In this way, Hopkins sprung rhythm can be seen as anticipating much of free verse. His work has no great affinity with either of the contemporary Pre-Raphaelite and neo-romanticism schools, although he does share their descriptive love of nature and he is often seen as a precursor to modernist poetry, or as a bridge between the two poetic eras.

Use of language
Hopkins was a supporter of linguistic purism in English. In an 1882 letter to Robert Bridges, Hopkins writes: "It makes one weep to think what English might have been; for in spite of all that Shakespeare and Milton have done... no beauty in a language can make up for want of purity." He took time to learn Old English, which became a major influence on his writing. In the same letter to Bridges he calls Old English "a vastly superior thing to what we have now."

He uses many archaic and dialect words but also coins new words. One example of this is twindles, which seems from its context in Inversnaid to mean a combination of twines and dwindles. He often creates compound adjectives, sometimes with a hyphen (such as dapple-dawn-drawn falcon) but often without, as in rolling level underneath him steady air. This use of compound adjectives, similar to the Old English use of compound nouns via kennings, concentrates his images, communicating to his readers the instress of the poet's perceptions of an inscape.

Added richness comes from Hopkins's extensive use of alliteration, assonance, onomatopoeia and rhyme, both at the end of lines and internally as in:

Hopkins was influenced by the Welsh language, which he had acquired while studying theology at St Beuno's near St Asaph. The poetic forms of Welsh literature and particularly cynghanedd, with its emphasis on repeating sounds, accorded with his own style and became a prominent feature of his work. This reliance on similar-sounding words with close or differing senses means that his poems are best understood if read aloud. An important element in his work is Hopkins's own concept of inscape, which was derived in part from the medieval theologian Duns Scotus. Anthony Domestico explains,Inscape, for Hopkins, is the charged essence, the absolute singularity that gives each created thing its being; instress is both the energy that holds the inscape together and the process by which this inscape is perceived by an observer. We instress the inscape of a tulip, Hopkins would say, when we appreciate the particular delicacy of its petals, when we are enraptured by its specific, inimitable shade of pink."

The Windhover aims to depict not the bird in general, but instead one instance and its relation to the breeze. This is just one interpretation of Hopkins's most famous poem, one which he felt was his best.

During his lifetime, Hopkins published few poems. It was only through the efforts of Robert Bridges that his works were seen. Despite Hopkins burning all his poems on entering the Jesuit novitiate, he had already sent some to Bridges, who with some other friends, was one of the few people to see many of them for some years. After Hopkins's death they were distributed to a wider audience, mostly fellow poets, and in 1918 Bridges, by then poet laureate, published a collected edition; an expanded edition, prepared by Charles Williams, appeared in 1930, and a greatly expanded edition by William Henry Gardner appeared in 1948 (eventually reaching a fourth edition, 1967, with N. H. Mackenzie).

Notable collections of Hopkins's manuscripts and publications are in Campion Hall, Oxford; the Bodleian Library, Oxford; and the Foley Library at Gonzaga University in Spokane, Washington.

Influences

Erotic
In 1970, Timothy d'Arch Smith, antiquarian bookseller, ascribed to Hopkins suppressed homoerotic impulses which he views as taking on a degree of specificity after Hopkins met Robert Bridges's distant cousin, friend, and fellow Etonian Digby Mackworth Dolben, "a Christian Uranian". 

In 1991, Robert Bernard Martin wrote in his biography Gerard Manley Hopkins: A Very Private Life, that when Hopkins first met Dolben, on Dolben's 17th birthday in Oxford in February 1865, it "was, quite simply, the most momentous emotional event of [his] undergraduate years, probably of his entire life." According to Robert Martin, "Hopkins was completely taken with Dolben, who was nearly four years his junior, and his private journal for confessions the following year proves how absorbed he was in imperfectly suppressed erotic thoughts of him." Martin considered it "probable that [Hopkins] would have been deeply shocked at the reality of sexual intimacy with another person."
Hopkins had composed two poems about Dolben, "Where art thou friend" and "The Beginning of the End". Robert Bridges, who edited the first edition of Dolben's poems as well as Hopkins's, cautioned that the second poem "must never be printed," though Bridges himself included it in the first edition (1918).

Another indication of the nature of his feelings for Dolben is that Hopkins's high Anglican confessor seems to have forbidden him to have any contact with Dolben except by letter. Hopkins never saw Dolben again, and any continuation of their relationship was abruptly ended by Dolben's drowning two years later in June 1867. Hopkins's feeling for Dolben seems to have cooled by that time, but he was nonetheless greatly affected by his death. "Ironically, fate may have bestowed more through Dolben's death than it could ever have bestowed through longer life ... [for] many of Hopkins's best poems – impregnated with an elegiac longing for Dolben, his lost beloved and his muse – were the result."  Hopkins's relationship with Dolben was explored in the 2017 novel The Hopkins Conundrum.

Some of Hopkins's poems, such as The Bugler's First Communion and Epithalamion, arguably embody homoerotic themes, although the second poem was arranged by Robert Bridges from extant fragments. In 2006, M. M. Kaylor, argued for Hopkins's inclusion with the Uranian poets, a group whose writings derived, in many ways, from prose works of Walter Pater, Hopkins's academic coach for his Greats exams and later a lifelong friend.

Some critics have argued that homoerotic readings are either highly tendentious, or that they can be classified under the broader category of "homosociality", over the gender, sexual-specific "homosexual" term. Hopkins's journal writings, they argue, offer a clear admiration for feminised beauty. In 2000, Justus George Lawler criticised Robert Martin's biography by suggesting that Martin "cannot see the heterosexual beam... for the homosexual biographical mote in his own eye... it amounts to a slanted eisegesis". The poems that elicit homoerotic readings can be read not merely as exercises in sublimation but as powerful renditions of religious conviction, a conviction that caused strain in his family and even led him to burn some poems that he felt were unnecessarily self-centred. In 2000, Julia Saville viewed the religious imagery in the poems as Hopkins's way of expressing the tension with homosexual identity and desire.

Christopher Ricks noted that Hopkins engaged in a number of penitential practices, "but all of these self-inflictions were not self-inflictions to him, and they are his business – or are his understanding of what it was for him to be about his Father's business." Ricks takes issue with Martin's apparent lack of appreciation of the importance of the role of Hopkins's religious commitment to his writing, and cautions against assigning a priority of influence to any sexual instincts over other factors such as Hopkins's estrangement from his family. In 2009, biographer Paul Mariani found in Hopkins poems "an irreconcilable tension – on the one hand, the selflessness demanded by Jesuit discipline; on the other, the seeming self-indulgence of poetic creation."

Isolation
Hopkins spent the last five years of his life as a classics professor at University College Dublin. Hopkins's isolation in 1885 was multiple: a Jesuit distanced from his Anglican family and his homeland, an Englishman teaching in Dublin during a time of political strife, an unpublished poet striving to reconcile his artistic and religious callings. The poem "To seem the stranger" was written in Ireland between 1885 and 1886 and is a poem of isolation and loneliness.

Influence on others
Ricks called Hopkins "the most original poet of the Victorian age." Hopkins is considered as influential as T. S. Eliot in initiating the modernist movement in poetry. His experiments with elliptical phrasing and double meanings and quirky conversational rhythms turned out to be liberating to poets such as W. H. Auden and Dylan Thomas. Hopkins also had a direct influence on the Ghanaian poet and novelist Kojo Laing, whose poem 'No needle in the sky' has been called an intercultural translation of Hopkins's 'The Windhover'. The American author Ron Hansen's novel, Exiles, who held the Gerard Manley Hopkins, SJ, Professorship in English at Santa Clara University, dramatizes Hopkins' composition of The Wreck of the Deutschland.

The Gerard Manley Hopkins Building in University College Dublin is named after him.

Selected poems
Well-known works by Hopkins include:
"Binsey Poplars"
"Pied Beauty"
"The Windhover: To Christ our Lord"
The Wreck of the Deutschland

Recordings

Richard Austin reads Hopkins's poetry in Back to Beauty's Giver.
Jeremy Northam reads Hopkins's poetry in The Great Poets.
American singer/songwriter Natalie Merchant set Hopkins's poem Spring and Fall: To a Young Child to music on her 2010 album Leave Your Sleep.
Author Simon Edge reads The Wreck of The Deutschland in a recording to accompany his novel The Hopkins Conundrum.
Paul Kelly (Australian musician) sings God's Grandeur on his 2018 album Nature.

See also

Adoro te devote (translated by G. M. Hopkins)
Caudate sonnet
Curtal sonnet (invented by G. M. Hopkins)
Sprung rhythm
Inscape and instress
Inscape (visual art)

References

Further reading
Abbott, Claude Colleer, ed., 1955. The Correspondence of Gerard Manley Hopkins and Richard Watson Dixon (London: Oxford University Press)
Abbott, Claude Colleer, ed., 1955. The Letters of Gerard Manley Hopkins to Robert Bridges (London: Oxford University Press)
Chakrabarti, Tapan Kumar, Gerard Manley Hopkins: His Experiments in Poetic Diction (manuscript Ph. D. dissertation approved by University of Calcutta)
Cohen, Edward H., ed. 1969. Works and Criticism of Gerard Manley Hopkins: A Comprehensive Bibliography. (Washington, D.C., The Catholic University of America Press)
Fiddes, Paul S., 2009. "G. M. Hopkins", in Rebecca Lemon, Emma Mason, Jonathan Roberts and Christopher Rowland, eds, The Blackwell companion to the Bible in English literature (Chichester: Wiley-Blackwell, pp. 563–576)
Jackson, Timothy F., "The Role of the Holy Spirit in Gerard Manley Hopkins's Poetry", Logos: A Journal of Catholic Thought and Culture (Winter 2006) vol. 9, no. 1, pp. 108–127)
MacKenzie, Norman H., ed., 1989. The Early Poetic Manuscripts and Note-books of Gerard Manley Hopkins in Facsimile (New York and London: Garland Publishing)
MacKenzie, Norman H.. ed., 1991. The Later Poetic Manuscripts of Gerard Manley Hopkins in Facsimile (New York: Garland Publishing)
Martin, Robert Bernard, 1992. Gerard Manley Hopkins – A Very Private Life (London: Flamingo/HarperCollins Publishers)
Pomplun, Trent, "The Theology of Gerard Manley Hopkins: From John Duns Scotus to the Baroque," Journal of Religion (January 2015, 95#1, pp: 1–34 DOI: 10.1086/678532)
Sagar, Keith, 2005. "Hopkins and the Religion of the Diamond Body", in Literature and the Crime Against Nature, (London: Chaucer Press)
Stiles, Cheryl, 2010. "Hopkins-Stricken: Gerard Manley Hopkins, a Selective Bibliography." (Berkeley Electronic Press)
Westover, Daniel and Thomas Alan Holmes, 2020. The Fire that Breaks: Gerard Manley Hopkins's Poetic Legacies (Clemson University Press)
White, Norman, 1992. Hopkins – A literary Biography (Oxford: Oxford University Press)

External links

Gerard Manley Hopkins, S.J. Conference, Regis University
Profile and poems at the Poetry Foundation. Retrieved 2010-03-18
Profile and poems at Poets.org
Gerard Manley Hopkins at St Beuno's retreat. Retrieved 2010-03-18
Annual Literary Festival – Monasterevin Hopkins Society, Ireland. Retrieved 2015-05-12
The Hopkins Society United Kingdom
UCD Letters, including 43 letters and postcards written to Alexander William Mowbray, between 1863 and 1888. A UCD Digital Library Collection.

: solo recordings of his collected poems
: recordings of individual short poems
Poems of Gerard Manley Hopkins. Ed. Robert Bridges. London: Humphrey Milford, 1918. Via HathiTrust

1844 births
1889 deaths
People from Stratford, London
People educated at Highgate School
Alumni of Balliol College, Oxford
People associated with University College Dublin
Anglo-Welsh poets
Converts to Roman Catholicism from Anglicanism
19th-century English Jesuits
19th-century English poets
Catholic poets
English Catholic poets
Sonneteers
Victorian poets
Infectious disease deaths in the Republic of Ireland
Deaths from typhoid fever
Burials at Glasnevin Cemetery
English male poets
Poet priests